The 1999 MFS Pro Tennis Championships, also known as the U.S. Pro Tennis Championships, was a men's tennis tournament played on outdoor hard courts at the Longwood Cricket Club in Boston, United States that was part of the World Series of the 1999 ATP Tour. It was the 71st and last edition of the tournament and was held from August 23 through August 29, 1999. Sixth-seeded Marat Safin won the singles title.

Finals

Singles
 Marat Safin defeated  Greg Rusedski 6–4, 7–6(13–11)
 It was Safin's 1st singles title of his career.

Doubles
 Guillermo Cañas /  Martín García defeated  Marius Barnard /  T. J. Middleton 5–7, 7–6(7–2), 6–3

References

External links
 ITF tournament details

MFS Pro Tennis Championships
1999
MFS Pro Tennis Championships
MFS Pro Tennis Championships
MFS Pro Tennis Championships
Tennis in Massachusetts